This is a record of the results of the Chile national team at the FIFA World Cup. The FIFA World Cup is an international association football competition contested by the men's national teams of the members of Fédération Internationale de Football Association (FIFA), the sport's global governing body. The championship has been awarded every four years since the first tournament in 1930, except in 1942 and 1946, due to World War II.

The tournament consists of two parts, the qualification phase and the final phase (officially called the World Cup Finals). The qualification phase, which currently take place over the three years preceding the Finals, is used to determine which teams qualify for the Finals. The current format of the Finals involves 32 teams competing for the title, at venues within the host nation (or nations) over a period of about a month. The World Cup Finals is the most widely viewed sporting event in the world, with an estimated 715.1 million people watching the 2006 tournament final.

The Football Federation of Chile is the second oldest South American federation, with 127 years of existence. Its foundation dates back to June 19, 1895, at the port city of Valparaiso. Its first President was David Scott. Chile is one of four founding member nations of CONMEBOL together with Argentina, Brazil, and Uruguay. They  established the South American footballing organization on July 9, 1916. The four original associations  enacted and participated in the first ever South American Championship which would later be named the Copa América.

Chile have appeared in nine FIFA World Cup finals to date, which were in 1930, 1950, 1962 (which they hosted), 1966, 1974, 1982, 1998, 2010 and 2014. Their best performance was in 1962, where they finished in third place.

Overall record

*Denotes draws including knockout matches decided via penalty shoot-out.
**Red border color indicates tournament was held on home soil.

By match

Record by opponent

Goalscorers

Most appearances

Awards

Team Awards

Third Place 1962

Individual Awards

Golden Boot 1962: Leonel Sánchez (shared)
Bronze Ball 1962: Leonel Sánchez

References

External links 
 FIFA Official Ranking of all Participants at Finals 1930–2002. FIFA Match Results for all Stages 1930–2002
 FIFA official site

 
Countries at the FIFA World Cup